ZBS stands for
 ZBS Foundation
 Zugbeeinflussungssystem S-Bahn Berlin
 Zone blocking scheme